Delalande's coua (Coua delalandei), also known as the snail-eating coua or Delalande's coucal, is an extinct species of non-parasitic cuckoo from Madagascar. It only was known to science as an extant bird for a very short time in the early 19th century. There is some disagreement about its area of occurrence: Although there were claims that the bird was also found in the area of Fito and Maroantsetra as well as near Toamasina (Tamatave),  i.e., the coastal areas of northern Toamasina Province, all specimens with good locality data are from the offshore island of Nosy Boraha. As the vernacular name implies, land snails were a favored food item of this species.

Extinction

Of the 14 specimens that exist nowadays, all but two are known to have taken between 1827 and 1834, many by the surgeon and naturalist Chevalier Joseph Alphonse Bernier. The Paris type specimen was in the collection of the Muséum national d'Histoire naturelle before that date, and one specimen may have been taken as late as 1850. As this species - the second-largest coua extant in modern times - was very spectacular, it was much sought after as a museum piece. However, it probably was restricted to coastal rainforest on Nosy Boraha, and its habitat was largely destroyed by deforestation in the course of the 19th century. Introduction of black rats may also have contributed to its demise, probably less by direct predation than by competition for food, but there probably was a thriving rat population on Nosy Boraha as soon as 1700, considering that the island was a favorite place for pirates to overhaul. Cats, which would have preyed on the bird, were probably introduced only in the 19th century and make a more likely candidate for an introduced species that had a negative impact on Delalande's coua.

There are some reports that the locals on the adjacent mainland were still occasionally hunting this bird for its decorative plumage in the 1920s, but these seem in error, these records probably referring to the blue coua. What is known with certainty is that in 1932, large sums were offered to well-connected animal dealers in Antananarivo for specimens of Delalande's coua, but they were unable to procure any. The color pattern of the species is unique among couas, which may be a hint that it evolved in fact in the isolation of Nosy Boraha and never occurred anywhere else. Specimens from "Tamatave" probably just indicate their port of shipment or the location of the animal dealer who procured them.

References

 Temminck, Coenraad Jacob (1827): [Coccycus delalandei]. In: Nouveau recueil de planches coloriees d'oiseaux, etc. 74: plate 440. Strasbourg & Amsterdam.

External links

3D view of specimen RMNH 110.100 at Naturalis, Leiden (requires QuickTime browser plugin).

Delalande's coua
Extinct birds of Madagascar
Delalande's coua
Bird extinctions since 1500
Species made extinct by human activities
Articles containing video clips
Fauna of the Madagascar lowland forests